Hecun may refer to:

 Hecun, Handan (和村镇), town in Fengfeng Mining District, Handan, Hebei, China
 Hecun, Jiangshan (贺村镇), town in Jiangshan, Zhejiang, China